The Big Bang UK Young Scientists and Engineers Fair, founded 2009, is the United Kingdom’s largest celebration of STEM (science, technology, engineering and maths) for young people, and is one of the largest youth events in the UK. The fair takes place annually in June. It is led by EngineeringUK in partnership with over 200 organisations across government, industry, education and the wider science and engineering community.

The Big Bang programme exists to bring science and engineering to life for young people. The Big Bang celebrates and raises the profile of young people’s achievements in science and engineering and encourages more young people to take part in science, technology, engineering and maths initiatives with support from their parents and teachers.

Big Bang at School events take place across the UK to enable young people to discover close to home the exciting and rewarding science and engineering careers that their science and maths subjects can lead to.

In 2012, the Big Bang Fair was hosted in the National Exhibition Centre in Birmingham. An all-girls team of pupils from a state school in the Highlands- Alness Academy were awarded the prestigious title of UK Young Engineers of the Year for their work on health and safety prototypes to be used in Haiti, which had recently suffered major earthquake damage alongside an outbreak of cholera. The six girls were Josie Tolliday, Emma Roddick, Cassie Armstrong, Meg Beattie, Holly Henderson and Kayleigh MacDonald.

The all-girl team have continued to excel in their extra-curricular activities. Cassie Armstrong is now an elected Member of Scottish Youth Parliament; Emma Roddick went on to become Donald Dewar Debater of the Year; Kayleigh MacDonald has been successful in dance competition Rock Challenge.

Criticism 
The Big Bang Fair has been criticised by NGOs such as the Campaign Against the Arms Trade and Friends of the Earth due to the heavy involvement of arms manufacturers and fossil fuel companies at the event. The event has been described as being a PR stunt rather than being a genuine attempt to educate children and get them involved in STEM in future. Furthermore it has also been criticised for presenting a "distorted view of the value of science" in reference to the involvement of arms manufacturers and oil companies.

References

External links

Annual events in the United Kingdom
Engineering education in the United Kingdom
Science events in the United Kingdom
Science exhibitions
Science festivals
Youth science